Daniel Thomas Moss (born 4 November 2000) is an English professional footballer who plays for Woking, as a  defender.

Career
Moss began his career with Burnley, joining Millwall in 2019, where he was captain of the under-23 team before moving on loan to Yeovil Town in August 2021. He returned from his loan in January 2022, before moving to Leyton Orient on loan later that month.

On 23 May 2022, Moss agreed to join National League club Woking on a free transfer, signing a two-year deal upon the expiration of his Millwall contract.

Career statistics

References

2000 births
Living people
English footballers
Association football defenders
Burnley F.C. players
Millwall F.C. players
Yeovil Town F.C. players
Leyton Orient F.C. players
Woking F.C. players
National League (English football) players
English Football League players